Omar Tejeda (born August 8, 1988 in Veracruz, Veracruz) is a Mexican former professional footballer.

Honours
Lobos BUAP
 Ascenso MX (1): Clausura 2017
 Campeón de Ascenso (1): 2016-17

References

External links

Omar Tejeda at Official Lobos BUAP Profile 

Living people
1988 births
Mexican footballers
People from Veracruz (city)
Liga MX players
Peruvian Primera División players
C.D. Veracruz footballers
Lobos BUAP footballers
FBC Melgar footballers
Association football midfielders
Mexican expatriate footballers
Mexican expatriate sportspeople in Peru
Expatriate footballers in Peru